Germanus or Germanos (Greek) may refer to:

People

Lucius Trebius Germanus, governor of Roman Britain around 126
Germanus (died c. 290), possibly apocryphal martyr-saint tortured at the Pula Arena
Germanus (4th century), Spanish martyr-saint (see Servandus and Cermanus)
Germanus of Auxerre (378–448), bishop of Auxerre who founded the Carolingian abbey of Saint-Germain en Auxerre named for the same saint
Germanus of Man (410–475), saint
Germain of Paris (Latin: Germanus) (496–576), bishop of Paris, Roman Catholic and Eastern Orthodox saint
Germanus of Capua (died 541), archbishop from 519
Germanus (cousin of Justinian I) (died 550), general of the Byzantine Empire
Germanus (Caesar), son-in-law of Tiberius II Constantine
Germanus (patricius) (died 605/606), leading senator in the reign of Emperor Maurice
Germanus (magister militum under Phocas) (died 604)
Germanus of Granfelden (612–675), saint
Germanus I, Patriarch of Bulgaria (972–990)
Germanus of Winchester (died c. 1013) English abbot
Nicolaus Germanus, 15th-century cartographer
Henricus Martellus Germanus, 15th-century cartographer
Moses Germanus or Johann Peter Spaeth (died 1701), a German convert to Judaism
Gyula Germanus (1884–1979), a Hungarian writer and islamologist

Greek clerics
Saint Germanus (died c. 733), 39th Patriarch of Constantinople
Germanus II of Constantinople (died 1240), 95th Patriarch of Constantinople
Germanus III of Constantinople (died 1267), 101st Patriarch of Constantinople
Germanos III of Old Patras (1771–1826), metropolitan bishop of Patras and participant in the Greek War of Independence
Germanus IV of Constantinople (died 1853), 213th Patriarch of Constantinople
, Archbishop of Athens (1889–1896)
Germanus V of Constantinople (died 1918), 225th Patriarch of Constantinople
Germanos Karavangelis (died 1935), Metropolitan Bishop of Kastoria, Amaseia, Ioannina, and Exarch of Central Europe.

Other uses
Sanctus Germanus, a titular see in the Roman Catholic church
Germanos Group, a Greek holding company
Germanos (chain of stores)

See also
Germain (disambiguation)
Germaine (disambiguation)
German (disambiguation)
Germán (disambiguation)
Germania (disambiguation)
Germanicus (disambiguation)
Saint Germanus (disambiguation)
Germanium, a chemical element with symbol Ge